Cercyon (Paracycreon) subsolanus, is a species of water scavenger beetle found in Bhutan, China, India, Indonesia, Malaysia, Nepal, Philippines, Singapore, Sri Lanka, Thailand, and Vietnam.

Description
Body length is about 2.6 to 3.2 mm. Can be identified by slightly convex median portion of metaventrite or metasternal pentagon which comprised with some short hair medially and posteriorly. Median portion of the metaventrite is flat. Elytra without a brownish central spot. The median lobe is gradually narrowing towards the apex with short, very thin sparse hairs anteriorly.

References 

Hydrophilidae
Insects of Sri Lanka
Beetles described in 1939